Remembering Babylon is a book by David Malouf, published in 1993. It won the inaugural International Dublin Literary Award and was shortlisted for the Booker Prize and the Miles Franklin Award.

The novel covers themes of isolation, language, relationships (particularly those between men), community and living on the edge (of society, consciousness, culture).

Its themes evolve into a greater narrative of an English boy, Gemmy Fairley, who is marooned on a foreign land and is raised by a group of aborigines, natives to the land in Queensland. When white settlers reach the area, he attempts to move back in the world of Europeans. As Gemmy wrestles with his own identity, the community of settlers struggle to deal with their fear of the unknown.

The narrative was influenced by the experiences of James Morrill, a shipwreck survivor who lived with Aboriginal people in North Queensland for 17 years from 1846 to 1863.

Style and themes
Malouf's narrative voice is at once scattered and singular, skipping between perspectives on the same events, and forcing the reader to pay close attention to each character's rendering in order to arrive at the most whole truth possible.  The magical realism theme is cultivated in the exaggerated response of all the characters to mundane items:  Gemmy surrenders to what he knows is a stick instead of a gun, because he attributes Lachlan's aiming it at him as a signal of the wariness of the other settlers.  The men of the community are in an uproar over a stone that visiting aborigines (supposedly) pass off to Gemmy for no logical reason—only because they fear whatever knowledge the aborigines have garnered of the land.  These settlers are the first whites to live on that soil, and view anything that is not white with an extreme wariness, not only of the physical land but the spiritual sense of the place.

Key quotations
Gemmy is first shown at the fence between the European settlement, and the aborigine lands, about to fall onto the white side while three European children watched.
"The creature or spirit in him had spoken up, having all along had the words in there that would betray him and which, when they came hooting out of his mouth, so astonished him: Do not shoot. I am a B-b-British object."(p.33)
Gemmy contemplating Janet:
"She was a puzzle to him.  He could never be sure what she was thinking.  He knew the boy's thoughts because he wanted them known.  His power lay in your recognizing that he possessed it.  It was a power that belonged to him because he was a boy; because one day, the authority he had claimed in raising the stick to his shoulder would be real.  The girl's power was entirely her own.  She needed no witness to it."(p. 36)
"He was a parody of a white man."(p.39)
The settlers:
"For at any moment--and this was the fact of the matter--they might be overwhelmed."(p.42)
"What you fix your gaze on is the little hard-backed flies that are crawling about in the corner of its bloodshot eyes and hopping down at intervals to drink the sweat of its lip.  And the horror it carries to you is not just the smell, in your own sweat, of a half-forgotten swamp-world going back deep in both of you, but that for him, as you meet here face to face in the sun, you and all you stand for have not yet appeared over the horizon of the world, so that after a moment all the wealth of it goes dim in you, then is canceled altogether, and you meet at last in a terrifying equality that strips the last rags from your soul and leaves you so far out on the edge of yourself that your fear now is that you may never go back.  It was the mixture of monstrous strangeness and unwelcome likeness that made Gemmy Fairley so disturbing to them, since at any moment he could show either one face or the other; as if he were always standing there at one of those meetings, but in his case willingly and the encounter was an embrace."(p.43)
Andy McKillop talking about Gemmy and the Aboriginals:
‘He may be harmless, but they aren’t, they aren’t fucken harmless.’ pp. 90

Gemmy's influence on the McIvor spouses.
Was he changed?  He saw now that he must be, since they were as they had always been and he could not agree with them.
     When had it begun?
     When they agreed to take Gemmy in.  That was the simple answer, since it was from that moment that some area of difference, of suspicion, had opened between them.  But the more he thought of it, the clearer it seemed that the difference must have always existed, since he too was as he had always been; only he had been blind to it, or had put it out of his mind from an old wish to be accepted - and why not? - or a fear of standing alone.
     He had never been a thinker, and he did not now become one, but he began to have strange thoughts.
     Some of them were bitter.  They had to do with what he saw, now that he looked, was in the hearts of men - quite ordinary folks like himself; he wondered that he had not seen it before.  What the other and stranger thoughts  had to do with he did not know.
    It was as if he had seen the world till now, not through his own eyes, out of some singular self, but through the eyes of a fellow who was always in company, even when he was alone; a sociable self, wrapped always in a communal warmth that protected it from dark matters and all the blinding light of things, but also from the knowledge that there was a place out there where the self might stand alone.
    Wading through waist-high grass, he was surprised to see all the tips beaded with green, as if some new growth had come into the world that till now he had never seen or heard of.
    When he looked closer it was hundreds of wee bright insects, each the size of his little fingernail, metallic, iridescent, and the discovery of them, the new light they brought to the scene, was a lightness in him - that was what surprised him - like a form of knowledge he had broken through to.   It was unnameable, which disturbed him, but was also exhilarating; for a moment he was entirely happy.
     But he wondered at himself.  A grown man of forty with work to do, standing dreamily stilled, extending his hand, palm downwards, over the backs of insects, all suspended in their tiny lives in a jewel-like glittering.
    Another time, by the creek, he looked up, casually he thought, and saw a bird.  It was balanced on a rounded stone dipping its beak into the lightly running water, its grey squat body as undistinguished and dusty looking as a sparrow's (but there were no sparrows here), its head grey, with a few untidy feathers.
     He was sitting, himself, on a larger stone, also rounded, eating the last of a sandwich, his boots in mud.
     But what his stilled blood saw was the bird's beak drawing long silver threads out of the heart of the water, which was all a tangle of threads, bunched or running; and his boots had no weight, neither did his hand with the half-bitten lump of bread in it, nor his heart, and he was filled with the most intense and easy pleasure: in the way the air stirred the leaves overhead and each leaf had attached itself to a twig, and whirled yet kept hold; and in the layered feathers that made up the grey of the bird's head; and at how long the threads of water must be to run so easily from where they had come from to wherever it was, imaginably out of sight, that they were going - tangling, untangling, running free.  And this time too the intense pleasure he felt had a disturbing side.
     The things he had begun to be aware of, however fresh and innocent, lay outside what was common, or so he thought; certainly, since he could have found no form in which to communicate them, outside words. (p.108-109)

Awards and nominations
International Dublin Literary Award, 1996: winner
Prix Baudelaire (France), 1995: winner
Los Angeles Times Book Prize for Fiction, 1994: winner
Commonwealth Writers Prize, South-East Asia and South Pacific Region, Best Book from the Region Award, 1994: winner
National Book Council Banjo Award for Fiction, 1994: shortlisted
Prix Femina (France), Best Foreign Novel, 1994: winner
New South Wales Premier's Literary Awards, Christina Stead Prize for Fiction, 1993: winner

References

External links
 Study guide

1993 Australian novels
Chatto & Windus books
Indigenous Australians in Queensland
Novels by David Malouf
Novels set in Queensland
Novels set in the 19th century